Planaltinella chapadana is a species of moth of the family Tortricidae. It is found in Minas Gerais, Brazil.

The wingspan is 15–26 mm. The ground colour of the forewings is whitish to beyond the middle, with greyish and yellowish spots. The ground colour is greyish in the terminal portion, where the spots are brownish yellow. The hindwings are whitish, in the terminal part of the wing tinged with brownish.

Etymology
The specific name refers to Chapada, the type locality.

References

Moths described in 2007
Cochylini